Hellcat is Meisa Kuroki's debut mini-album, released on April 8, 2009. It peaked at #9 on the weekly Oricon albums chart.

Track listing

Charts

Oricon Sales Chart

Physical Sales Charts

References

External links
Meisa Kuroki Official Site

2009 EPs
Meisa Kuroki albums
Japanese-language EPs